Pascal Charrière (born 14 November 1964) is a Swiss racewalker. He competed in the men's 50 kilometres walk at the 1992 Summer Olympics and the 1996 Summer Olympics.

References

1964 births
Living people
Athletes (track and field) at the 1992 Summer Olympics
Athletes (track and field) at the 1996 Summer Olympics
Swiss male racewalkers
Olympic athletes of Switzerland
Place of birth missing (living people)